Max Paul Riedel (19 February 1870, Magdeburg- 27 March 1941 
Frankfurt (Oder)) was a German entomologist who specialised in Diptera, especially Tipulidae and Tachinidae. He wrote "Die palaarktischen Arten der Dipteren-Gattung Tipula L." and many shorter scientific papers on Tipulidae.

His insect collection is in the Museum für Naturkunde in Berlin.

Works
 Die palaarktischen Arten der Dipteren-Gattung Tipula L., in: Abhandlungen des Vereins fur Naturwissenschaftliche Erforschung des Niederrheins, Krefeld 1: 1-122  (1913)

References

Sachtleben, H. 1940 [Riedel, M. P.] Arb. morph. taxon. Ent. Berlin-Dahlem 7(1) 77
Sachtleben, H. 1941: [Riedel, M. P.] Arb. morph. taxon. Ent. Berlin-Dahlem 8(1)

External links
 Tipulidae Site List of Riedel's publications on Tipulidae.
 DEI biografi Portrait

German entomologists
Dipterists
1870 births
1941 deaths